The 2013 raid on Baraawe was a military operation by SEAL Team Six to capture or kill Abdikadar Mohamed Abdikadar "Ikrima", a senior member of the Al-Shabaab insurgent group. It was launched in the southern town of Barawa, Somalia in October 2013.

Operation 
He stated that the foreign soldiers had silencer guns, and exchanged gunfire and grenades with the militants before being driven away. Musab later asserted that the attack was launched by the UK SAS unit as well as Turkish special forces, and that one British commander was killed during the raid and four other SAS operatives were fatally wounded. Additionally, a Somali intelligence official indicated that a Chechen Al-Shabaab leader was the target of the mission, and that the insurgent commander was wounded during the offensive and one of his guards was killed.

Somali police stated that the operation had the approval of the Somali government, and that seven individuals were killed during the mission. Both NATO and EU Navfor denied involvement in the raid, as did a Turkish Foreign Ministry representative. A spokeswoman for the British Defence Ministry also said that she and her colleagues were not aware of any British involvement in the operation. According to another Somali intelligence official, the target of the raid was Al-Shabaab leader Ahmed Godane (Mukhtar Abu Zubeyr). A senior US military representative also indicated that SEAL Team Six, the special operations unit responsible for killing Osama bin Laden in Pakistan in 2011, launched the offensive but later abandoned the mission after coming under more fire than expected. Speaking about the aborted mission, US Secretary of State John Kerry said that the insurgents "can run but they can't hide". A spokesman for the Pentagon likewise asserted that US soldiers had been involved in a counter-terrorism mission in Somalia against a known Al-Shabaab member, but did not elaborate. He also indicated that there were no US fatalities during the operation. US officials later confirmed that the target of the raid was Al-Shabaab commander Abdikadar Mohamed Abdikadar "Ikrima".

References 

Somali Civil War (2009–present)
Al-Shabaab (militant group)
Battles involving the United States
2013 in Somalia
October 2013 events in Africa
21st-century military history of the United States